"Johnny" is a song recorded by Nigerian Afro pop recording artist Yemi Alade, taken from her debut studio album King of Queens (2014). The song was an international smash hit in many countries including Nigeria, Tanzania, Kenya, Ghana, South Africa, Liberia, Uganda, Zimbabwe, The United Kingdom and others. The music video was directed by Clarence Peters. Before the song was released, it was leaked over the internet.

Music video
The music video was uploaded on March 4, 2014 onto Alade's official Vevo account. The music video shows how the title character, "Johnny" (played by Nigerian actor and model Alex Ekubo), cheats and lies about his relationship with several women in the clip.

The music video currently has 120.6 million views on YouTube as of August 21, 2020. It is one of the most viewed music videos on YouTube by a Nigerian artist and the most viewed by a female Nigerian artist.

Accolades
"Johnny" was nominated for Best Pop Single and Song of the Year at The Headies 2014. It currently now surpasses more than a 100 million views on YouTube.

References

2013 singles
2013 songs
Yemi Alade songs
Nigerian afropop songs